Powell Creek is an unincorporated community in Boone County, West Virginia, United States. The Powell Creek Post Office was once known as Coalbloom a former coal town.

References 

Unincorporated communities in West Virginia
Unincorporated communities in Boone County, West Virginia
Coal towns in West Virginia